Eucelatoria is a genus of flies in the family Tachinidae.

Species
Eucelatoria albopilosa (Curran, 1926)
Eucelatoria argentea (Thompson, 1968)
Eucelatoria armigera (Coquillett, 1889)
Eucelatoria aurata (Townsend, 1927)
Eucelatoria aurea (Thompson, 1968)
Eucelatoria aurescens Townsend, 1917
Eucelatoria auriceps (Aldrich, 1926)
Eucelatoria australis Townsend, 1911
Eucelatoria bigeminata (Curran, 1927)
Eucelatoria botyvora (Robineau-Desvoidy, 1830)
Eucelatoria bryani Sabrosky, 1981
Eucelatoria carinata (Townsend, 1919)
Eucelatoria charapensis (Townsend, 1919)
Eucelatoria cinefacta (Reinhard, 1967)
Eucelatoria claripalpis (Thompson, 1968)
Eucelatoria comata (Wulp, 1890)
Eucelatoria comosa (Wulp, 1890)
Eucelatoria cora (Bigot, 1889)
Eucelatoria currani Nihei & Dios, 2016
Eucelatoria deplanata (Wulp, 1890)
Eucelatoria dicax (Giglio-Tos, 1893)
Eucelatoria digitata Sabrosky, 1981
Eucelatoria dimmocki (Aldrich, 1932)
Eucelatoria discalis (Thompson, 1968)
Eucelatoria dissepta (Wulp, 1890)
Eucelatoria dominica Sabrosky, 1981
Eucelatoria elongata (Cortés & Campos, 1974)
Eucelatoria elongata (Wulp, 1890)
Eucelatoria eucelatorioides (Blanchard, 1963)
Eucelatoria fasciata (Townsend, 1927)
Eucelatoria ferox (Townsend, 1912)
Eucelatoria flava Inclán & Stireman, 2014
Eucelatoria gladiatrix (Townsend, 1917)
Eucelatoria guimaraesi Sabrosky, 1981
Eucelatoria heliothis Sabrosky, 1981
Eucelatoria humeralis (Wulp, 1890)
Eucelatoria hypodermica (Townsend, 1927)
Eucelatoria incompleta (Curran, 1928)
Eucelatoria inepta (Wulp, 1890)
Eucelatoria intrusa (Wulp, 1890)
Eucelatoria jamaicensis (Curran, 1926)
Eucelatoria leucophaeata (Reinhard, 1967)
Eucelatoria longula (Curran, 1934)
Eucelatoria luctuosa (Wulp, 1890)
Eucelatoria meridionalis (Townsend, 1912)
Eucelatoria minima (Wulp, 1890)
Eucelatoria montana Townsend, 1929
Eucelatoria nana (Townsend, 1927)
Eucelatoria nigella (Wulp, 1890)
Eucelatoria nigripalpis (Bigot, 1889)
Eucelatoria nigripalpis (Thompson, 1968)
Eucelatoria obumbrata (Wulp, 1890)
Eucelatoria ocellaris (Townsend, 1927)
Eucelatoria oppugnator (Walton, 1914)
Eucelatoria ordinaria (Wulp, 1890)
Eucelatoria paracarinata Nihei & Dios, 2016
Eucelatoria parkeri (Sabrosky, 1952)
Eucelatoria physonotae (Thompson, 1968)
Eucelatoria pollens (Wulp, 1890)
Eucelatoria procincta (Reinhard, 1935)
Eucelatoria rivalis (Reinhard, 1953)
Eucelatoria robusta (Thompson, 1968)
Eucelatoria rubentis (Coquillett, 1895)
Eucelatoria strigata (Wulp, 1890)
Eucelatoria tantilla (Wulp, 1890)
Eucelatoria teffeensis (Townsend, 1927)
Eucelatoria tenella (Reinhard, 1937)
Eucelatoria teutonia Sabrosky, 1981
Eucelatoria texana (Reinhard, 1923)
Eucelatoria tinensis (Townsend, 1927)
Eucelatoria turbinata (Wulp, 1890)

References

Diptera of South America
Diptera of North America
Exoristinae
Tachinidae genera
Taxa named by Charles Henry Tyler Townsend